Bernard Tomic won in the final 4–6, 7–6(7–5), 6–0, against Yang Tsung-hua and claimed the title, becoming the youngest player to win a grand slam title.

Brydan Klein was the defending champion, but did not compete in the juniors event that year.

Seeds

Draw

Finals

Top half

Section 1

Section 2

Bottom half

Section 3

Section 4

External links
Draw
Qualifying Draw

Boys' Singles
Australian Open, 2008 Boys' Singles